Ana Victoria Cate Aguilar (born 5 August 1991) is an American-born Nicaraguan former footballer who played as a midfielder. She was a member of the Nicaragua women's national team and was the first Nicaraguan woman to play professionally in Europe. Her mother is Nicaraguan and her father is American.

Playing career
Ana grew up in FishHawk, Florida, playing high school soccer for Joe E. Newsome High School in Lithia, before attending Auburn University. From 2013 to 2014, she played for Durham University where she was the team's Most Valuable Player during the 2014 season.
In 2014, she became the first woman from Nicaragua to play professionally in Europe, when she signed with FH Hafnarfjörður of the Icelandic First Division, scoring four (4) goals and 10 assists in 17 of the 18 games she played in the season. She started in 16 games. 
In 2015, she played with Stjarnan of the Icelandic First Division, starting in two games. She became the first Nicaraguan to score in, and the first Nicaraguan to win a pre-season title in a European first-division league.

She retired from playing following the 2020 season.

National team career
In 2013, Cate scored two (2) goals against Guatemala at the X Central American Sports Games in Costa Rica for Nicaragua's first silver medal in this discipline.

By 2014, she was part of the Nicaragua national team at the XXII Central American and Caribbean Games held in Veracruz, Mexico. During the qualifying phase she was declared the Man of the Match in Nicaragua's 1-0 win over the Dominican Republic.

Coaching career
Cate served as the strength trainer of Stjarnan from 2017 to 2018 for HK/Víkingur in 2019. In November 2022, she was hired as a strength trainer for Breiðablik.

Personal life
In 2018, Cate joined Soccer Without Borders Nicaragua, an organization that promotes gender equality. She is also a member of Common Goal, an organization through which professional footballers donate a portion of their salary to global social change programs.

References 

1991 births
Living people
People with acquired Nicaraguan citizenship
Nicaraguan women's footballers
Women's association football midfielders
Nicaragua women's international footballers
Competitors at the 2014 Central American and Caribbean Games
Central American Games silver medalists for Nicaragua
Central American Games medalists in football
Nicaraguan people of American descent
Ana Cate
Ana Cate
Ana Cate
Ana Cate
Nicaraguan expatriate footballers
Nicaraguan expatriate sportspeople in Iceland
Expatriate women's footballers in Iceland
American women's soccer players
Soccer players from Florida
Sportspeople from Hillsborough County, Florida
American people of Nicaraguan descent
Auburn Tigers women's soccer players
American expatriate women's soccer players
American expatriate sportspeople in Iceland
Alumni of Durham University